Cyrtinae is a subfamily of the Acroceridae (small-headed flies). Their larvae are endoparasites of araneomorph spiders in the subgroup Entelegynae.

Genera
The subfamily includes twelve extant genera and two extinct:
 Asopsebius Nartshuk, 1982
 †Cyrtinella Gillung & Winterton, 2017
 Cyrtus Latreille, 1796
 Hadrogaster Schlinger, 1972
 Holops Philippi, 1865
 Meruia Sabrosky, 1950
 Nipponcyrtus Schlinger, 1972
 Opsebius Costa, 1856
 Paracyrtus Schlinger, 1972
 Sabroskya Schlinger, 1960
 Subcyrtus Brunetti, 1926
 Turbopsebius Schlinger, 1972
 †Villalites Hennig, 1966
 Villalus Cole, 1918

References

Acroceridae
Brachycera subfamilies
Endoparasites